The 1924 Oklahoma A&M Cowboys football team represented Oklahoma A&M College in the 1924 college football season. This was the 24th year of football at A&M and the fourth under John Maulbetsch. The Cowboys played their home games at Lewis Field in Stillwater, Oklahoma. They finished the season 6–1–2, 1–1–1 in the Southwest Conference. This season became the first year OAMC's teams were nicknamed the Cowboys and their final season in the Southwest Conference.

Schedule

References

Oklahoma AandM
Oklahoma State Cowboys football seasons
Oklahoma AandM